The 1999 XXXV FIBA International Christmas Tournament "Trofeo Raimundo Saporta-Memorial Fernando Martín" was the 34th edition of the FIBA International Christmas Tournament. It took place at Raimundo Saporta Pavilion, Madrid, Spain, on 24 and 25 December 1998 with the participations of Real Madrid Teka, CSKA Moscow (champions of the 1997–98 Super League A), Partizan and Union Olimpija (runners-up of the 1997–98 1. Slovenska Košarkarska Liga).

Semifinals

December 24, 1998

|}

Third place game

December 25, 1998

|}

Final

December 25, 1998

|}

Final standings

References

1998–99 in European basketball
1998–99 in Russian basketball
1998–99 in Slovenian basketball
1998–99 in Spanish basketball